Hingalganj is a census town in the Hingalganj CD block in the Basirhat subdivision of the North 24 Parganas district in the state of West Bengal, India.

Etymology
The name Hingalganj came after the name of Tillman Henkel, district judge and magistrate in Jessore district from 1781. He developed the settlement there.

Geography

Location

The Ichhamati, the second most important river in the district after the Hooghly "flows south easterly meandering course over C.D. Blocks like Bagda, Bongaon and Basirhat-I and Basirhat-II and thus forms the international boundary with Bangladesh." It finally meets the Raimangal further south.

Area overview
The area shown in the map is a part of the Ichhamati-Raimangal Plain, located in the lower Ganges Delta. It contains soil of mature black or brownish loam to recent alluvium. Numerous rivers, creeks and khals criss-cross the area. The tip of the Sundarbans National Park is visible in the lower part of the map (shown in green but not marked). The larger full screen map shows the full forest area. A large section of the area is a part of the Sundarbans settlements. The densely populated area is an overwhelmingly rural area. Only 12.96% of the population lives in the urban areas and 87.04% of the population lives in the rural areas.

Note: The map alongside presents some of the notable locations in the subdivision. All places marked in the map are linked in the larger full screen map.

Civic administration

Police station
Hingalganj police station serves a population of 112,941. It has jurisdiction over Hingalganj CD block.

CD block HQ
The headquarters of Hingalganj CD block are located at Hingalganj.

Demographics
According to the 2011 Census of India, Hingalganj town had a total population of 8,179, of which 4,129 (50%) were males and 4,050 (50%) were females. Population in the age range 0–6 years was 812. The total number of literate persons in Hingalganj was 5,503 (74.70% of the population over 6 years).

Transport
This is what a two-wheeler rider wrote after a visit to the area in 2014: "Hasnabad is a border town (with Bangladesh) and also the last significant town in the area. Vigil is very high. Any one travelling to that area is advised to have at least one photo ID proof so that could be showed to the BSF. After crossing the Ichhamati River, it’s a 15 odd km ride to Hingalganj – a small sleepy place of around 5 sq km. Road is not wide but save 1 km, is a pleasure to ride."

The 684 m long bridge across the Katakhali at Hasnabad was opened to public in March 2019, linking Hingalganj with Hasnabad. Lebukhali, the last point up to which motorised transport can reach is now directly connected to Kolkata and other places.

Education
Hingalganj Mahavidyalaya was established at Hingalganj in 2005. It is a co-educational institution affiliated with the West Bengal State University and offers honours courses in Bengali, English, Sanskrit, geography and education, and a general course in arts.

Hingalganj High School is a Bengali-medium co-educational school. It was established in 1948. It has arrangements for teaching from Class VI to XII.

Healthcare
Hingalganj has a  primary health centre with 6 beds.

References

Cities and towns in North 24 Parganas district